26th was a station on the Chicago Transit Authority's South Side Main Line, which is now part of the Green Line. The station was located at 26th Street and Wabash Avenue in the Near South Side neighborhood of Chicago. 26th was situated south of Cermak and north of 29th. 26th opened on June 6, 1892, and closed on August 1, 1949.

References

Defunct Chicago "L" stations
Railway stations in the United States opened in 1892
Railway stations closed in 1949
1892 establishments in Illinois
1949 disestablishments in Illinois
Railway stations in Chicago